Pas-des-Lanciers is a railway station in southern France. It is located in the hamlet of Pas-des-Lanciers, on the territory of the commune of Saint-Victoret. It is situated on the Paris–Marseille railway. The station is served by local trains (TER Provence-Alpes-Côte d'Azur) to Avignon and Marseille.

References

External links
 Station information (in French)

Railway stations in Bouches-du-Rhône
Railway stations in France opened in 1847